Diego Santos Gama Camilo (born 22 November 1994), commonly known as Biro Biro, is a Brazilian professional footballer who plays for Nova Iguaçu Futebol Clube as a forward.

Career statistics

Club

Other includes Brazilian state competitions and national super cups.

References

External links
Biro Biro at playmakerstats.com (English version of ogol.com.br)

1994 births
Living people
Sportspeople from Rio de Janeiro (state)
Brazilian footballers
Association football forwards
Campeonato Brasileiro Série A players
China League One players
Fluminense FC players
Associação Atlética Ponte Preta players
Shanghai Shenxin F.C. players
São Paulo FC players
Nova Iguaçu Futebol Clube players
Botafogo de Futebol e Regatas players
Brazilian expatriate footballers
Expatriate footballers in China
Brazilian expatriate sportspeople in China